The Express Rail Link Sdn Bhd is a company that owns and operates the airport rail link of the same name that connects the Kuala Lumpur International Airport (KLIA) with the Kuala Lumpur Sentral (KL Sentral) transportation hub, 57 kilometres apart. The company operates two different train services:

KLIA Ekspres, a direct airport rail service directly from KLIA to KL Sentral, launched on 14 April 2002.
KLIA Transit, a commuter rail service with three additional stops between KLIA and KL Sentral, launched on 20 June 2002.

Background 

Express Rail Link Sdn. Bhd. (ERL) is a joint venture company between YTL Corporation Berhad, Lembaga Tabung Haji, SIPP Rail Sdn. Bhd. and Trisilco Equity Sdn. Bhd. with each partner holding 45%, 36%, 10% and 9% of the company respectively. On 25 August 1997, the Malaysian government presented the company with a 30-year concession to finance, build, maintain and control the operations of the railway.

Construction began in May 1997 and was completed 5 years later. It was then handed over to SYZ consortium, a joint relations consortium between German and Malaysian companies consisting of Siemens, Siemens Electric Engineering Sdn. Bhd and Syarikat Pembenaan Yeoh Tiong Lay Sdn. Bhd (SPYTL), a wholly owned subsidiary of YTL Corporation Bhd.

ERL Maintenance and Support was set up in 1999 and is responsible for the operations and maintenance of trains owned by ERL. The company was initially a joint venture between Express Rail Link Sdn. Bhd. and Siemens, but since June 2005 it has been wholly owned by Express Rail Link Sdn. Bhd.

The 1997 financial crisis that hit Asia caused a brief setback to the project but due to strong governmental support, the project went on to completion. The project racked up a cost of RM2.4 billion which was financed through equity mergers (RM500 million), loans from Development and Infrastructure Bank of Malaysia (RM940 million) and the remainder through import credit from four German financial institutions.

Units and subsidiaries 
ERL Maintenance Support Sdn Bhd, or E-MAS, is ERL's operations and maintenance (O&M) subsidiary. E-MAS had working together with CRCC since 2012 on the operation & maintenance of Al Mashaaer Al Mugaddassah Metro Southern Line which their 13 employees were selected for the first outing in 2012 and another 29 employees were sent in 2013. In 2014 Hajj season, ERL has been working with Prasarana Malaysia to help fulfil CRCC's manpower requirements.

Major facilities 
Customs, Immigration and Quarantine (CIQ) facilities
Departure lounges
Passenger arrival and departure halls
Underground track area
Duty-free outlets
Food and beverage outlets
Station parking

Rolling stock 

Both the KLIA Ekspres and KLIA Transit use 12 four-car Siemens Desiro ET 425 M electric multiple unit (EMU) trains. The trains are derived from and technically similar to the DBAG Class 425 used on S-Bahn systems in Germany and run at a maximum commercial speed at 160 km/h, the fastest speed for rail travel in Malaysia.

On 27 November 2014, Express Rail Link ordered from CRRC Changchun six new 4-car trains to cater to the ridership growth of both KLIA Ekspres and KLIA Transit services. CRRC's Zhuzhou plant had already supplied rolling stock to the Rapid KL Ampang Line and KTM Komuter. Of the six new trains, two will be used for KLIA Ekspres and four for KLIA Transit. Delivery of the six new trains will be made progressively from May 2016 onwards, after which testing will be done. ERL expects all six trains to be operational by November 2016.

Commercial service commenced on 13 March 2018 using CRRC Changchun Equator EMUs.

Fleet

Ridership

Accidents 
On 24 August 2010, Express Rail Link suffered their first reported accident in which 3 passengers were injured. Two ERL trains collided at Kuala Lumpur Sentral, Of the trains involved one of them was about to depart at 9.45pm for Kuala Lumpur International Airport while the other train, which was empty, rammed into its rear.

Expansion 
A 2.14 km extension to the new KLIA2 terminal of Kuala Lumpur International Airport has been completed. Commercial service commenced on 1 May 2013.

There are proposals to extend the line with two to four stations to Seremban and Melaka.

Due to automatic termination of Kuala Lumpur–Singapore high-speed rail bilateral agreement after passing postponement deadline on 31 December 2020, the government planned to extend the line until Johor Bahru as an alternative for the cancelled HSR project.

Awards and achievements

Gallery

References

External links 

KLIA Ekspres
Kuala Lumpur's airport in the city opens for business  Railway Gazette International May 2002

 
Privately held companies of Malaysia
Malaysian companies established in 2002
Railway companies established in 2002